The Seguro Obrero massacre occurred on September 5, 1938, and was the Chilean government's response to an attempted coup d'état by the National Socialist Movement of Chile (MNSCh), whose members were known at the time as  ("Nazis"), with some differences that justified their option for a different name. After a failed coup involving a stand-off and a shootout, about 60 Nacistas who had surrendered after being given assurances, were summarily shot. About twenty others were killed during the fighting.

Background

The Seguro Obrero Massacre took place on 5 September 1938, in the midst of a heated three-way election campaign between the liberal-conservative Gustavo Ross Santa María, the radical Popular Front's Pedro Aguirre Cerda, and the newly formed Popular Alliance candidate, Carlos Ibáñez del Campo. The National Socialist Movement of Chile supported Ibáñez's candidacy, which had been announced on September 4. In order to preempt Ross's victory, the National Socialists mounted a coup d'état that was intended to take down the liberal government of Arturo Alessandri Palma and place Ibáñez in power.

Coup

 

At around 12:30 on September 5, 1938, approximately 30 armed Nazi youths (nacistas) affiliated with the National Socialist Movement occupied the Seguro Obrero building. José Luis Salazar, a carabinero (uniformed police) who was on watch, upon observing the situation, thought that the Nazis were concealing weapons under their coats, and prepared to respond. However, a member of the Nazi movement who observed the reaction of the serviceman  started to fire, mortally wounding Salazar.

In reaction, a short while later a crowd of carabineros gathered at the foot of the building. Heavy firing between the opposing sides began. Gerald Gallmeyer, a Nazi youth, was killed. His companions resisted, but the carabineros forces forced them to retreat.

In the meantime, another 32 youths had occupied the central building at the University of Chile. This also culminated in a shoot out, beginning at 02:00, when an assault by the carabineros took members of the National Socialist group by surprise; those who surrendered were led with their hands up, toward the Seguro Obrero a few blocks away. There they were informed that the attempted coup had already failed, and were sent to convince their companions to lay down the arms on the condition that their lives would be respected. The Nazi activists accepted the promise and surrendered.

Although disarmed and captured, nearly 60 of the Nazis were lined against a wall and shot,  breaking the promise to respect their lives. Only four youths managed to escape death. The bodies were facially and bodily disfigured by deep wounds from sabers and bayonets.

It remains unclear who ordered the shootings. Some attested that Arturo Alessandri Palma dispatched a presidential order to "Kill them all!" Alessandri wanted it to be believed that the Nazis had killed each other, but this allegation has been widely accepted as false. Nevertheless, the accusations against Alessandri are grounded in speculation rather than tangible evidence. It's said that Alessandri himself denied giving the order even on his death bed.

See also
 Ariostazo
 Chilean political scandals
 History of Chile
 List of massacres in Chile
 Operation Bolivar
 World War II by country#Chile

References

External links
TIME article on the political aftermath

Conflicts in 1938
Massacres in 1938
Fascism in Chile
Presidential Republic (1925–1973)
Political scandals in Chile
Massacres in Chile
1938 in Chile
Nazis in South America
Nazism
Mass murder in 1938
Attempted coups in Chile
September 1938 events
1930s coups d'état and coup attempts
Political violence in Chile